Domenico Fioravanti (born 31 May 1977) is a retired Italian competitive swimmer who won two gold medals in the 2000 Summer Olympics in Sydney.

Career 
Domenico Fioravanti was born at Novara, Piedmont. He started to swim competitively at the age of nine, and one year later began training daily, spurred by his elder brother Massimiliano who was also a swimmer. In 1995 he took part at his first European Championship. In 1999 he was European champion in the 100 m breaststroke.

In 2000 Fioravanti became the first Italian swimmer to win a gold medal in the Olympic Games, winning both the 100 m and 200 m breaststroke races. He also won another gold European medal in the 100 m breaststroke. In 2001 he received the silver medal in the 100 m breaststroke and bronze medal in the 50 m breaststroke at the World Championship. Moreover, he won the Italian championship thirty times. In 2004 he was forced to retire from competitive swimming due to a genetic heart anomaly.

Personal bests 
In long course swimming, Fioravanti's personal bests are:
50 m breaststroke: 27.72
100 m breaststroke: 1:00.46
200 m breaststroke: 2:10.87

See also
 Italian swimmers multiple medalists at the internetional competitions
 List of members of the International Swimming Hall of Fame

References

External links
 
 

1977 births
Sportspeople from the Province of Novara
Living people
Italian male swimmers
Italian male breaststroke swimmers
Olympic swimmers of Italy
Swimmers at the 2000 Summer Olympics
Olympic gold medalists for Italy
World Aquatics Championships medalists in swimming
Swimmers of Fiamme Gialle
Medalists at the FINA World Swimming Championships (25 m)
European Aquatics Championships medalists in swimming
Medalists at the 2000 Summer Olympics
Olympic gold medalists in swimming
Mediterranean Games gold medalists for Italy
Swimmers at the 1997 Mediterranean Games
Goodwill Games medalists in swimming
Mediterranean Games medalists in swimming
Competitors at the 1998 Goodwill Games
20th-century Italian people